Monique Scott is an American politician, currently serving as an alderman in the Chicago City Council representing the 24th ward, which includes portions of North Lawndale, South Austin and West Garfield Park. She was appointed to the position to replace retiring alderman (and her brother), Michael Scott, on June 22, 2022.

References 

21st-century American politicians
African-American people in Illinois politics
Chicago City Council members
Living people
21st-century African-American politicians
Chicago City Council members appointed by Lori Lightfoot
Year of birth missing (living people)